Erythrophleum couminga is a species of leguminous tree in the genus Erythrophleum. It is endemic to the western coastal region of Madagascar, occurring in the Baie de Baly National Park. The bark is used in traditional medicine and the branches are used for fencing posts.

Description
The trunk has rough, fissured bark and the twigs are downy when young. The leaves are compoundly bipinnate with two to four pairs of pinnae. The inflorescence is a loose panicle growing in a leaf axil. The individual flowers are small, bisexual and cream-coloured with parts in fives.

Distribution and habitat
It grows in mixed deciduous woodland and wooded savannas, in association with palm trees, preferring sandy soils.

Uses
The timber of this tree is durable and resistant to rot but is little used apart from making fencing posts. The foliage is poisonous to cattle, and the flowers and the bark are even more toxic. The bark contains complex diterpenoid alkaloids and is powdered and used in traditional medicine in very small quantities as a laxative. In larger quantities, an extract of the bark is a powerful, cardiac poison, rapidly causing shortness of breath, convulsions and cardiac arrest. In the past, the bark has been used as a poison in trials by ordeal, a custom continuing in Madagascar into the mid-nineteenth century.

References

couminga
Plants used in traditional African medicine